Klippan Municipality is a municipality in Skåne County in southern Sweden. Its seat is located in the town of Klippan.

The municipality was created in 1974 through the amalgamation of the market town Klippan (itself instituted in 1945) with the rural municipality of Riseberga and part of Östra Ljungby.

Söderåsen National Park is partly situated within the municipality.

Localities
There were five localities in the municipality in 2018.

Buildings 
The Church of St. Peter, designed by Sigurd Lewerentz, was completed in 1966.

References

External links

Klippan Municipality - Official site

Municipalities of Skåne County